Adolfo Enríquez García (born 2 March 1990), known as Fofo, is a Spanish footballer who plays as a striker for CF La Nucía.

Club career
Born in Alicante, Valencian Community, Fofo came through the youth ranks at hometown team Alicante CF, making his senior debut for their reserves in Tercera División in 2009 before transferring to regional neighbours Villarreal CF. He first played with the B side in Segunda División on 26 September of that year in a 2–2 home draw against Albacete Balompié as a late substitute, making three more such appearances over the season; he scored his first goal as a professional on 18 September 2011, in a 3–3 draw with CD Guadalajara also at the Estadio El Madrigal.

On 24 January 2012, Fofo signed for Segunda División B club SD Ponferradina, helping them to promotion via the playoffs. He netted a career-best ten goals over the 2013–14 campaign, including two on 8 September 2013 in a 2–2 home draw against Sporting de Gijón.

Fofo fulfilled a childhood dream by signing a two-year contract at fellow second-tier side RCD Mallorca on 29 July 2014. On 31 January 2016, after cutting his ties, he switched to UE Llagostera scoring once in an eventual unsuccessful attempt to save the Catalans from relegation in the same league. 

On 14 July 2016, Fofo stayed in division two by agreeing to a one-year deal at CD Mirandés.

References

External links

1990 births
Living people
Spanish footballers
Footballers from Alicante
Association football forwards
Segunda División players
Segunda División B players
Tercera División players
Segunda Federación players
Villarreal CF C players
Villarreal CF B players
SD Ponferradina players
RCD Mallorca players
UE Costa Brava players
CD Mirandés footballers
CF La Nucía players